Michael N. Chernoff (born c. 1936) is a Canadian curler and geologist from West Vancouver, British Columbia.

Personal life
Chernoff has a degree in geological engineering from Queen's University at Kingston. He was born in Kamsack, Saskatchewan. He is married to Dorine. After graduating from Queens, Chernoff worked as a geologist, conducting field studies across Canada for several oil and gas companies including California Standard, Pinnacle Petroleum, and Ulster Petroleum. He founded Strom Resources in 1979, and sold it to PennWest. He founded Paclata Resources in 1987 with his son Bruce, developing oil and gas operations in a number of different countries. It was sold to Alberta Energy Company in 1999.

He was a director at Encana (now Ovintiv) and Canadian Hydro Developers.

Teams

References

External links
 
 Mike Chernoff – Curling Canada Stats Archive

1930s births
Living people
Canadian male curlers
Brier champions
Queen's University at Kingston alumni
Canadian geologists
People from West Vancouver
Curlers from Calgary
Canadian oilmen
Curlers from Ontario
Curlers from Saskatchewan
Curlers from British Columbia
20th-century Canadian people